The Mediterranean Ridge is a wide ridge in the bed of the Mediterranean Sea, running along a rough quarter circle from Calabria, south of Crete, to the southwest corner of Turkey.

It is an accretionary wedge caused by the African Plate subducting under the Eurasian and Anatolian plates.  As the African Plate moves slowly north-northeastward, the sedimentary rocks covering the Mediterranean seafloor are being affected by active shortening, involving both thrust faulting and folding, lifting them up and forming the ridge.

Along the ridge, five deep basins full of anoxic brine have been found (including the L'Atalante basin), where Messinian evaporite deposits of brine caught up in this ongoing orogeny have dissolved.

In the far future, it could form part of a long high mountain range as the continued northward movement of the African Plate obliterates the eastern part of the Mediterranean Sea.

Incipient collision with Africa
The central section of the Mediterranean Ridge shows evidence for the initial stages of collision with the Cyrenaica peninsula. Detailed bathymetric mapping using multibeam echosounders, shows that deformation within the "outer zone" (southernmost part) of the ridge, is much more intense against the promontory, with out-of-sequence thrusting replacing the gentle folding observed further east and west.

References

Regional geology
Orogeny
Landforms of the Mediterranean Sea
Plate tectonics